Tulsi Ram Silawat is a cabinet minister in Madhya Pradesh state government and member of Madhya Pradesh Legislative Assembly representing Sanwer constituency of Indore district two times. He took oath as a cabinet minister of new MP government on 25 December 2018.
He joined the Bharatiya Janata Party on 21 March 2020 and took Oath on 21 April 2020 as the Minister of Water Resources of Madhya Pradesh under CM Shivraj Singh Chouhan's Cabinet formation. On 20 October 2020, he resigned from the post of Water Resources Minister. Because, as per Article 164 (4) of the Indian Constitution, a minister who is not a member of the House has to be elected to an assembly within 6 months of being appointed minister.

Career

In December 2018, he was inducted into the Kamal Nath cabinet as Minister of Public Health and Family Welfare of Madhya Pradesh. During 2020 Madhya Pradesh political crisis, he supported senior Congress leader Jyotiraditya Scindia and joined BJP with the 22 MLAs who resigned.

See also
Madhya Pradesh Legislative Assembly
2013 Madhya Pradesh Legislative Assembly election
2008 Madhya Pradesh Legislative Assembly election
1985 Madhya Pradesh Legislative Assembly election

References

External links
Tulsi Silawat on Twitter
Tulsi Silawat on Facebook

Living people
Madhya Pradesh MLAs 1985–1990
Madhya Pradesh MLAs 2008–2013
1954 births
Indian National Congress politicians from Madhya Pradesh
Bharatiya Janata Party politicians from Madhya Pradesh
Madhya Pradesh MLAs 2018–2023
Politicians from Indore